Corey Reynolds (born July 3, 1974) is an American actor known for originating the role of Seaweed in the Broadway adaptation of Hairspray, and for the TNT crime show The Closer.

Early life and career
Reynolds was born in Richmond, Virginia, where he attended Monacan High School before moving to California to pursue his acting career. He got his start at Paramount Kings Dominion performing in various shows. While living in California, he was cast in a touring production of the revue Smokey Joe's Cafe, as well as the tour of Saturday Night Fever. After this run, he went to New York City and auditioned for various shows. He was originally cast in Hairspray'''s ensemble, but was offered the role of Seaweed after three readings. For this role, he was nominated for a Tony Award and Drama Desk Award, both for Outstanding Featured Actor in a Musical.

Reynolds guest starred on Without a Trace and appeared in The Guardian prior to his role in The Closer. To research this role, Reynolds drew on his past career in security and law enforcement.

Reynolds has appeared in films such as The Terminal, Red Tails, and Straight Outta Compton.  He plays Sheriff Mike Thompson in the SyFy comedy-drama Resident Alien''.

Filmography

Film

Television

References

External links

 
 
 Interview. NPR, June 9, 2006. Retrieved November 4, 2006

1974 births
African-American male actors
American male musical theatre actors
Living people
Male actors from Richmond, Virginia
21st-century American male actors
American male television actors
American male film actors
20th-century African-American male singers
21st-century African-American people